Nemoossis belloci, also known as the long-fin bonefish is a species of ray-finned fish in the family Albulidae endemic to the eastern Atlantic Ocean. This species is the only member of its genus.

References

long-fin bonefish
Fish of the East Atlantic
Marine fauna of West Africa
long-fin bonefish
Taxa named by Jean Cadenat